The 2021 W Series was the second season of the W Series motor racing championship, replacing the 2020 season after it was cancelled due of the COVID-19 pandemic. The championship was exclusively open to female racing drivers as a Formula Regional-level racing series in support of the 2021 Formula One World Championship.

Jamie Chadwick entered the season as the defending W Series champion, having won the title in 2019. Chadwick secured her second consecutive championship, winning the 2021 title at the season finale race, at Circuit of the Americas.

Entries 
The following drivers and teams made up the grid for the 2021 W Series season. All teams used Hankook tyres, and ran two mechanically identical Tatuus F.3 T-318 cars with two drivers. All cars were operated by Fine Moments, and 'teams' were purely for sponsorship and identification purposes.

Driver changes 
The top twelve drivers from the 2019 championship were all qualified for the 2020 season, leaving eight vacancies in the driver line-up. The final 18 drivers were announced on 17 December 2020, with the possibility of more being announced at a later date. A list of five reserve drivers was announced on 11 June 2021, comprising 2019 drivers Gosia Rdest, Naomi Schiff and Caitlin Wood, British F4 podium finisher Abbi Pulling, and Tasmin Pepper, who was unable to take part in the season due to the COVID-19 travel restrictions.

Championship changes 
Hitech GP announced on 14 November 2020 that they would discontinue their involvement for 2021 as they moved into new series, and Fine Moments took over their role for the 2021 season. The series continues to use the same Tatuus T-318 Formula 3 chassis and Alfa Romeo engines. On 24 June 2021 W Series announced it would pivot from a centrally-run series format to a team-based structure with assigned drivers and control over the car livery and team overalls, as well as the team name. The 2021 season would be used as a transitional season, with an unofficial teams' championship and all outfits still being centrally run, but with a vision for a fully team-structured grid and a legitimate teams' championship for the 2022 season. Prioritising the importance of driver skill within the championship, and to ensure technical equality, all 18 cars, although sporting a variety of liveries and team names, will remain mechanically identical, with preparation and maintenance managed by W Series Engineering. Hankook was initially dropped as the tyre supplier for the 2021 season due to the move from the Deutsche Tourenwagen Masters to F1 support bill, and W Series was reportedly "speaking to a number of tyre suppliers". On 5 May 2021, however, W Series announced Hankook would continue to supply tyres for the 2021 season.

Calendar and results 

The series management announced on 12 November 2020 that the season would consist of eight rounds all held in support of the 2021 Formula One World Championship. A provisional calendar was then revealed on 8 December 2020. After Formula One made slight amendments to its calendar, the W Series moved its first event from Circuit Paul Ricard to the Red Bull Ring. Later on in the year, when Formula One postponed the 2021 Mexico City Grand Prix, the season finale was shifted from the Autódromo Hermanos Rodríguez to the Circuit of the Americas.

Championship standings

Scoring system 
Points were awarded to the top ten classified finishers as follows:

Drivers' Championship

Notes

References

External links 

 

 
W Series
W Series
W Series (championship)